Hediger is a surname. Notable people with the surname include:

Dennis Hediger (born 1986), Swiss footballer
Heini Hediger (1908–1992), Swiss biologist
Helmut Hediger (born 1945), Austrian sprint canoeist
Jovian Hediger, Swiss cross-country skier
Markus Hediger (born 1959), Swiss writer and translator